João Batista de Andrade (born 14 December 1939) is a Brazilian film director and screenwriter. He directed more than 20 films between 1967 and 2006. His 1981 film O Homem que Virou Suco won the Golden Prize at the 12th Moscow International Film Festival.

On 22 May 2017, Batista assumed as acting minister of Culture after the resignation of Roberto Freire. Resigned a few weeks later after president Michel Temer involvement in the meat company JBS complaints.

Selected filmography
 O Homem que Virou Suco (1981)

References

External links

1939 births
Living people
Brazilian film directors
Brazilian screenwriters
People from Minas Gerais
Cidadania politicians
Ministers of Culture of Brazil